Chinese Taipei participated  in the 2014 Asian Games in Incheon, South Korea from 19 September to 4 October 2014.
Ten gold medals were won in weightlifting, taekwondo, cycling, karate, tennis, bowling, and golf.

Football

Women's tournament
Group Stage

Quarter Final

References

Nations at the 2014 Asian Games
2014
Asian Games